St. Elizabeth's Medical Center (SEMC) (more often called St. Elizabeth's Hospital, its former name, or its nickname, St. E's) is a large medical facility and teaching hospital in the Brighton neighborhood of Boston, Massachusetts.

It is part of Steward Health Care System, the second largest health care system in New England which was founded in 2012, and is a teaching hospital for the Boston University School of Medicine.

Besides advanced capabilities in inpatient and outpatient care, SEMC's research laboratories are active centers of investigation in such areas as cardiology, gastroenterology, neurology, hematology and oncology.

The hospital traces its history to 1868 when five Catholic women started the hospital to care for sick immigrant women and as a place of shelter for retired and feeble women in domestic service.  By 1882 the hospital served patients of any gender, and in 1914, the first hospital building was built at the facility's current location in Brighton.

In 2018–2019, the annual U.S. News & World Report hospital rankings, awarded and recognized the Medical Center for achieving the highest performance rating possible, in two (Heart Bypass surgery & Heart Failure) of nine measured categories in adult medical procedures and conditions.

SEMC's Department of Obstetrics and Gynecology is of particular note as its history predates many other areas of medicine in which the hospital is involved.  Generations of people in the Boston area were born at St. Elizabeth's Hospital or more recently, at St. Elizabeth's Medical Center. Former New York City mayor Michael Bloomberg was born at St. Elizabeth's Hospital in 1942.

References

External links

St. Elizabeth's Medical Center of Boston
Steward Health Care

Teaching hospitals in Massachusetts
Hospitals in Boston
1868 establishments in Massachusetts